Eggerberg is a railway station in the Swiss canton of Valais and municipality of Eggerberg. The station is located on the Lötschberg line of the BLS AG, and is adjacent to Eggerberg village.

The station is served by the following passenger train:

A connecting PostAuto bus service links the station and village with Finnen, Eggen, Baltschieder and Visp.

Eggerberg station is an intermediate point of the Lötschberg South Ramp walking trail, which parallels the south ramp of the Lötschberg railway as it descends the northern flank of the Rhone valley into Brig.

References

External links 

Railway stations in the canton of Valais
BLS railway stations